You Are All Diseased is the 16th album and 11th HBO live broadcast stand-up special by comedian George Carlin, recorded on February 6, 1999 at the Beacon Theatre in New York City and released on CD in May of that year.

Track listing
"How's Everybody Doin'?" - 0:54
"Airport Security" - 8:02
"Fear of Germs" - 5:58
"Cigars" - 1:39
"Angels" - 1:10
"Harley-Davidson" - 1:23
"House of Blues" - 2:00
"Minority Language" - 2:12
"Man Stuff" - 5:23
"Kids and Parents" - 6:51
"TV Tonight" - 3:53
"Names" - 4:23
"Advertising Lullabye" - 2:37
"American Bullshit" - 2:39
"Businessmen" - 1:26
"Religion" - 2:06
"There Is No God" - 8:37

References

External links 
 
 George Carlin official website
 
 George Carlin at Laugh.com
 

1999 live albums
1990s American television specials
1990s in comedy
George Carlin live albums
Stand-up comedy albums
HBO network specials
Stand-up comedy concert films
1999 television specials
1990s comedy albums